The Mayoral election of 1965 in Pittsburgh, Pennsylvania was held on Tuesday, November 2, 1965. The incumbent mayor, Joe Barr of the Democratic Party was victorious for his second term.

A total of 184,604 votes were cast. The 1965 race marks the last time that a Republican candidate was marginally competitive, as Barr defeated attorney Vince Rovitto by only about a 25% margin of victory. Subsequent Republicans have generally failed to achieve 30% of the total vote.

Results

References

1965 Pennsylvania elections
1965 United States mayoral elections
1965
1960s in Pittsburgh
November 1965 events in the United States